Cosmomycin B is an anthracycline antibiotic.

References

Anthracyclines